Clifford Gatt Baldacchino (born 9 February 1988) known as ‘Il-Balda’ is a Maltese international footballer who plays for Gżira United, as a centre back and also as a right back

Career
Gatt Baldacchino has played club football for Sliema Wanderers, Mqabba and Tarxien Rainbows. He has won the Euro Challenge Cup, the Super Cup and also the FA Trophy all with Sliema. He has played seven times in the Europa league all for Sliema.

He played for his country at under-19 (three official matches) and under-21 (nine official matches) levels. He made his senior international debut for Malta in 2013.

References

1988 births
Living people
Maltese footballers
Malta international footballers
Association football fullbacks
Sliema Wanderers F.C. players
Mqabba F.C. players
Tarxien Rainbows F.C. players